Back on the Road may refer to:

 "Back on the Road" (Madcon song), 2008
 "Back on the Road" (Earth, Wind & Fire song), 1980

See also
 "Back on Road", a song by Gucci Mane, 2016